The English suffix -graphy means a "field of study" or related to "writing" a book, and is an anglicization of the French -graphie inherited from the Latin -graphia, which is a transliterated direct borrowing from Greek.

Arts 
 Cartography – art and field of making maps
 Choreography – art of creating and arranging dances or ballets
 Cinematography – art of making lighting and camera choices when recording photographic images for the cinema.
 Collagraphy - In printmaking, a fine art technique in which collage materials are used as ink-carrying imagery on a printing plate. 
 Iconography – art of interpreting the content by icons.
 Klecksography – art of making images from inkblots.
 Lithography – planographic printing technique
 Photography – art, practice or occupation of taking and printing photographs.
 Photolithography – method for microfabrication in electronics manufacturing.
 Pornography – practice, occupation and result of producing sexually arousing imagery or words.
 Pyrography – art of decorating wood or other materials with burn marks.
 Serigraphy – printmaking technique that uses a stencil made of fine synthetic material through which ink is forced.
 Tasseography – art of reading tea leaves
 Thermography – thermal imaging.
 Tomography – three-dimensional imaging
 Typography – art and techniques of type design
 Videography – art and techniques of filming video.
 Vitreography – in printmaking, a fine art technique that uses glass printing matrices.
 Xerography – means of copying documents.

Writing 
 Cacography – bad handwriting or spelling
 Calligraphy – art of fine handwriting
 Cryptography – art of writing hidden secrets
 Orthography – rules of correct writing
 Palaeography – study of historical handwriting
 Pictography – use of pictographs
 Steganography – art of writing hidden messages
 Stenography – art of writing in shorthand

Science 
 Geography – use of images to depict the Earth and its regions.
 Radiography – use of X-rays to produce medical images

Types of works 
 Autobiography – biography of a person written by themselves
 Bibliography – list of writings used or considered by an author in preparing a particular work
 Biography – account of a person's life
 Discography – listing of sound recordings
 Filmography – list of movie titles that share a similar characteristic such as the same genre, the same director, the same actor, etc.
 Ludography or gameography – list of games, specifically video games

Fields of study 
 Areography – geography of Mars (studies the physical features of the planet)
 Cartography – study and making of maps
 Cosmography – study and making of maps of the universe or cosmos
 Cryptography – study of securing information.
 Crystallography – study of crystals
 Demography – study of the characteristics of human populations, such as size, growth, density, distribution, and vital statistics
 Encephalography – recording of voltages from the brain
 Ethnography – study of cultures
 Floriography – language of flowers
 Geography – study of spatial relationships on the Earth's surface
 Hagiography – study of saints
 Historiography – study of the study of history
 Holography – study and mapping of computer project imaged called Holograms for interactive and assisted computations.
 Hydrography – measurement and description of any waters
 Oceanography – exploration and scientific study of the ocean and its phenomena
 Orography – science and study of mountains
 Reprography – reproduction of graphics through mechanical or electrical means
 Selenography – study and mapping of the physical features of the Moon
 Topography – study of Earth's surface shape and features or those of planets, moons and asteroids
 Uranography – study and mapping of stars and space objects

See also 
 -ism
 -ology
  -logy
 List of words ending in ology

References
 
 

English suffixes
Lists of words